Najibullah Zadran (born 28 February 1993) is an Afghan cricketer and the vice captain of the Afghanistan Twenty20 International (T20I) side. Zadran is a left-handed batsman who bowls right-arm off break. He made his international debut for Afghanistan in July 2012.

Career

T20 franchise career
On 3 June 2018, Zadran was selected to play for the Montreal Tigers in the players' draft for the inaugural edition of the Global T20 Canada tournament. In September 2018, he was named in Kandahar's squad in the first edition of the Afghanistan Premier League tournament. The following month, he was named in the squad for the Chittagong Vikings team, following the draft for the 2018–19 Bangladesh Premier League.

In June 2019, Zadran was selected to play for the Winnipeg Hawks franchise team in the 2019 Global T20 Canada tournament. In November 2019, he was selected to play for the Khulna Tigers in the 2019–20 Bangladesh Premier League. In August 2020, he was named in the St Lucia Zouks squad for the 2020 Caribbean Premier League, replaced Colin Ingram who missing out the competition due to visa limitations.

In April 2021, Zadran was signed by Karachi Kings to play in the rescheduled matches in the 2021 Pakistan Super League. In November 2021, he was selected to play for the Dambulla Giants following the players' draft for the 2021 Lanka Premier League.

International career
Zadran represented Afghanistan Under-19s in the 2011 Under-19 World Cup Qualifier in Ireland.  Zadran made his Twenty20 debut for the Afghan Cheetahs in the Faysal Bank Twenty-20 Cup against Rawalpindi Rams. He made two further appearances in that competition against Faisalabad Wolves and Multan Tigers. He scored 58 runs in this three appearances, at an average of 29.00, with a high score of 51 not out. This score came against Rawalpindi Rams, in a match in which he also claimed his maiden wicket when he dismissed Sohail Tanvir.

In December 2018, Zadran was named as the captain of Afghanistan's under-23 team for the 2018 ACC Emerging Teams Asia Cup. In March 2019, in the third ODI against Ireland, he scored his first ODI century.

In April 2019, Zadran was named in Afghanistan's 15 man squad for the 2019 Cricket World Cup. In July 2021, Zadran was named as the vice captain of the Afghanistan's T20I team. In September 2021, he was named in Afghanistan's squad for the 2021 ICC Men's T20 World Cup.

References

External links

1993 births
Living people
Afghan cricketers
Afghan Cheetahs cricketers
Afghanistan One Day International cricketers
Afghanistan Twenty20 International cricketers
Pashtun people
Cricketers at the 2015 Cricket World Cup
Cricketers at the 2019 Cricket World Cup
Band-e-Amir Dragons cricketers
Chattogram Challengers cricketers
Kandahar Knights cricketers
Dambulla Aura cricketers